Mary Anne Trump (May 10, 1912 – August 7, 2000) was a Scottish-American domestic worker. She was the wife of real-estate developer Fred Trump. She is the mother of Donald Trump, the 45th president of the United States.

Born in the Outer Hebrides of Scotland, Mary Trump immigrated to the United States in 1930 and became a naturalized citizen in March 1942. She raised five children with her husband and lived in the New York area.

Early life 
Mary Anne MacLeod was born in a pebbledashed croft house owned by her father since 1895 in the village of Tong, Lewis, Scotland. Raised in a Scottish Gaelic-speaking household, Mary was the youngest of ten children born to Malcolm (1866–1954) and Mary MacLeod ( Smith; 1867–1963). Her father was a crofter, fisherman and compulsory officer at Mary's school. English was her second language, which she learned at the school she attended until secondary school.

Her paternal grandparents were Alexander MacLeod and Ann MacLeod; her maternal grandparents were Donald Smith and Mary MacAulay. They were from the locations of Vatisker and South Lochs, respectively. Donald died at sea aged 34 when his sailing ship sank, a common fate for men in the region which was dependent on fishing. Some of the family's generations had been forced off their land as part of the Highland Clearances. According to one genealogical account, displaced families in Mary's village lived in "human wretchedness" while nearby farmable land was used as game reserves. Local historians have said properties at the time were "indescribably filthy", and that families in the area lived austere lives as fishers, farmers and peat diggers. The outbreak of  weakened the area's economy and male population further.

Immigration to the United States 
With several siblings having already established themselves there, MacLeod may have first visited the United States for a short stay in December 1929. She was issued immigration visa number 26698 at Glasgow on February 17, 1930. On May 2, MacLeod left Glasgow on board the RMS Transylvania arriving in New York City on May 11 (one day after her 18th birthday). She declared she intended to become a U.S. citizen and would be staying permanently in America. She was one of tens of thousands of young Scots who left for the United States or Canada during this period, Scotland having suffered badly the consequences of the Clearances and World War I. The alien passenger list of the Transylvania lists her occupation as a domestic worker.

Arriving in the U.S. with $50 (equivalent to $887 in 2022), MacLeod lived with her older sister Christina Matheson on Long Island and worked as a domestic servant for at least four years. One of these jobs appears to have been as a nanny for a well-to-do family in a New York suburb, but the position was eliminated due to economic difficulties caused by the Great Depression. As a 2016 account in Scottish newspaper The National put it, she "started life in America as a dirt-poor servant escaping the even worse poverty of her native land." Having obtained a U.S. Re-entry Permit—only granted to immigrants intending to stay and gain citizenship—she returned to Scotland on the SS Cameronia on September 12, 1934. She was recorded as living in New York by April 1935 in the 1940 U.S. Census.

Though the 1940 census form filed by Mary Anne and her husband, Fred Trump, stated that she was a naturalized citizen, she did not actually become one until March 10, 1942. However, there is no evidence that she violated any immigration laws prior to her naturalization, as she frequently traveled internationally and was afterwards able to re-enter the U.S. MacLeod returned to her home area in Scotland often during the course of her life and spoke Gaelic when she did.

Marriage, family and activities 
In the mid-1930s, while MacLeod was living with her sister in Queens, she met Fred Trump—already a property developer and builder—at a party; on a subsequent visit to Scotland, she told her family that she had met her future husband. They married at the Madison Avenue Presbyterian Church on January 11, 1936, with George Arthur Buttrick officiating. The wedding reception for 25 guests was held at the Carlyle Hotel in Manhattan. They honeymooned in Atlantic City, New Jersey. On April 5, 1937, she gave birth to their first child, Maryanne, followed by Fred Jr. (1938–1981), Elizabeth (born 1942), Donald (born 1946), and Robert (1948–2020). The final birth led to an emergency hysterectomy, which she barely survived.

The family lived in Jamaica, Queens, and later specifically in Jamaica Estates. At first, the couple lived in the house of MacLeod's mother-in-law; however, by 1940, the couple, having moved out, had begun an upwardly mobile existence, having taken on a Scottish domestic servant for their own household. MacLeod generally worked as a housewife within the family, but sometimes helped with her husband's real estate business, such as collecting coins from laundry machines in family-owned apartment buildings.

MacLeod raised her children in the Presbyterian faith of her upbringing; on January 20, 2017, incoming U.S. President Donald Trump took his inaugural oath of office using a copy of the Revised Standard Version Bible given to him by his mother in 1955 when he graduated from a Presbyterian Sunday school. MacLeod drove a Rolls-Royce that bore the vanity plates "MMT", the initials of her name, Mary MacLeod Trump.

MacLeod also acted as a volunteer in a hospital and was involved in school activities and charities, including the betterment of those with cerebral palsy and efforts to improve the lives of intellectually disabled adults. The Trumps were active in the Salvation Army, the Boy Scouts of America, and the LightHouse for the Blind and Visually Impaired, among other charities.
MacLeod had a significant role at the Women's Auxiliary of Jamaica Hospital and likewise at the Jamaica Day Nursery. She and her husband donated time, effort, services, and several medical buildings around New York; a 228-bed nursing home pavilion at Jamaica Hospital Medical Center, where she spent years volunteering, is named after her. MacLeod also belonged to several social clubs.

As a parent, MacLeod was more reserved than her husband. Friends of the children observed fewer interactions with her than with him. In appearance, MacLeod was slight of build but was known for an elaborate hairstyle, labeled in one account a "dynamic orange swirl", similar to the hairstyle her son Donald would later become known for.

In 1981, MacLeod's oldest son, Fred Jr., died from complications due to alcoholism.

Later life and death 
As she grew older, Trump suffered from severe osteoporosis. On October 31, 1991, at 79, she was mugged while shopping on Union Turnpike near her home. She resisted the mugger's attempt to steal her purse, which contained $14, and was then knocked to the ground and beaten. She sustained broken ribs, facial bruises, several fractures, a brain hemorrhage, and permanent damage to her sight and hearing. A bread-truck driver named Lawrence Herbert apprehended Paul LoCasto, her 16-year-old assailant, for which he was later rewarded by Donald Trump with a check that kept him from losing his home to foreclosure. Paul LoCasto later pleaded guilty to robbery and assault, and was sentenced to three to nine years in prison.

Mary Anne's husband, Fred Trump, died at age 93 in June 1999 after falling ill with pneumonia. She died one year later on August 7, 2000, at Long Island Jewish Medical Center in New Hyde Park, New York, at age 88. Services were held at Marble Collegiate Church in Manhattan and she was buried alongside her husband and son (Fred Jr.) at Lutheran All Faiths Cemetery in Middle Village, Queens. The death notice in her Scottish hometown newspaper, the Stornoway Gazette, read: "Peacefully in New York on August 7, Mary Ann  Trump, aged 88 years. Daughter of the late Malcolm and Mary MacLeod, 5 Tong. Much missed."

References

External links 
 Scottish Roots page
 Pavilion website named after her

1912 births
2000 deaths
20th-century American people
20th-century American women
Burials in New York (state)
Mothers of presidents of the United States
Naturalized citizens of the United States
People from the Isle of Lewis
People from Jamaica Estates, Queens
Philanthropists from New York (state)
Scottish emigrants to the United States
Mary Anne MacLeod
Presbyterians from New York (state)